Gernot Suppan (born 18 November 1985) is an Austrian footballer who plays for ASK Voitsberg.

References

External links

Austrian footballers
1985 births
Living people
SK Sturm Graz players
DSV Leoben players
SC Rheindorf Altach players
Wolfsberger AC players
Kapfenberger SV players
Austrian Football Bundesliga players
2. Liga (Austria) players
Austrian Regionalliga players
Association football defenders